La Ligugéenne Football is a French association football club founded in 1922. The club is based in Ligugé and their home stadium is the Stade Municipal Maurice Girault in the town.

They played in Régional 2 in the 2021-2022 season and finished first in their group, earning promotion to Régional 1 after being relegated 12 years ago. Next season La Ligugéenne will play in Régional 1 in the Nouvelle-Aquitaine region.

External links
Official Website :http://www.ligugeennefootball.fr/  

Communication Live Match : https://scorenco.com/football/clubs/la-ligugeenne-football/

1922 establishments in France
Sport in Vienne
Association football clubs established in 1922
Football clubs in Nouvelle-Aquitaine